Kasserine (Tunisian Arabic: ڨصرين ) is the capital city of the Kasserine Governorate, in west-central Tunisia. It is situated below Jebel ech Chambi ( جبل الشعانبي), Tunisia's highest mountain. Its population is 114.463 (2020).

History 
In classical antiquity Kasserine was a Roman colony, known as Cillium. Under Roman Emperor Vespasian (69–79) or Titus (79-81), it was elevated to the rank of municipium, and under the Severan dynasty (193-235) to that of colonia (Cillilana). It became Roman territory following the defeat of Carthage in 146 BC, belonging to the provinces of Africa, Africa Vetus, Africa Proconsularus, and finally Africa Byzacena following the reforms of Diocletian in 314 AD.

Archaeological evidence remains on site: mausoleums, triumphal arches, thermae, a theatre and a Christian basilica.

One noted monument is the Tomb of the Flavii, built for local landowner Titus Flavius Secundus in the late second century AD. The Tomb contains a 110-line poem memorializing Flavius, and is the "longest extant Latin funerary epitaph from antiquity."

The theater was built at the end of the first century AD, probably to celebrate elevation of the town to a municipium, It was restored, and reopened for performances in 2018.

In 544 the Byzantines were defeated by the Berbers in the Battle of Cillium.

The town was renamed Kasserine, meaning "The Two Palaces", which is a reference to the two Roman mausoleums.

In 1906, an attack by local bedouin on isolated settler farms near Kasserine, and the French civil administration offices during the Thala-Kasserine Disturbances was the first violent resistance to French authority under the protectorate.

Ecclesiastical history 
Cillium was important enough in the Roman province of Byzacena to become a suffragan of the Metropolitan of Hadrumetum.

Cillium was represented at the Conference of Carthage (411) between Catholic and Donatist bishops by the Catholic Tertiolus and the Donatist Donatus. In 484, Fortunatianus of Cillium was one of the Catholic bishops whom the Arian Vandal king Huneric summoned to Carthage and then exiled.

Titular see of Cillium 
No longer a residential bishopric, Cillium is today listed by the Catholic Church as a titular see.

Since its nominal restoration in 1925, the Latin titular bishopric has had the following incumbents, both of the lowest (episcopal) rank:
 Boleslavs Sloskāns (1926.05.05 – 1981.04.18), Apostolic Administrator of Mohilev (Belarus) (1926.08.13 – 1981.04.18) and Apostolic Administrator of Mi(e)nsk (Belarus) (1926.08.13 – 1981.04.18)
 Louis Anthony DeSimone, (1981.06.27 – 2018.10.05), Auxiliary Bishop emeritus of Philadelphia

Geography 
Kasserine is located in western central Tunisia. By road it is 200 kilometres west of Sfax, 246 kilometres (180 mi) south-west of Tunis, 166 kilometres (141 mi) south-west of Sousse.
 
Kasserine is divided into 11 districts:
 El Arich 
 Ennour District
 Essalem District
 Ezzouhour District
 El Bassatine District
 El Fath District
 El Karma District
 El Khadhra District
 El Manar District
 Olympic District
 Zouhour District

Climate

Sports 

Kasserine's most popular sport club is the AS Kasserine (football, soccer).

Notable people 
 Faouzia Aloui (born in 1958), a poet and fiction writer.
 Karim Haggui (born January 20, 1984), a football defender

References

Notes

Sources and external links
 GigaCatolic, with titular ncumbent biography links

See also 
 Battle of the Kasserine Pass
 Kasserine Dam
 History of Roman-era Tunisia

Cities in Tunisia
Communes of Tunisia
Cillium
Populated places in Kasserine Governorate